The men's 3 metre springboard was one of four diving events included in the Diving at the 1996 Summer Olympics programme.

The competition was split into three phases:

Preliminary round 29 July — Each diver performed a set number of dives without any limitation on the difficulty degree. The 18 divers with the highest total score advanced to the semi-final.
Semi-final 28 July — Each diver performed a set number of dives without any limitation on the difficulty degree. The 12 divers with the highest combined score from the semi-final and preliminary dives advanced to the final.
Final 29 July — Each diver performed a set number of dives, without limitation on the difficulty degree. The final ranking was determined by the combined score from the final and semi-final dives.

Results

References

Sources
 

Men
1996
Men's events at the 1996 Summer Olympics